Kai yang or gai yang (literally meaning "grilled chicken"), also known as  kai ping or gai ping, or pīng kai, is a Lao dish originating in Laos, but it is now commonly eaten throughout the whole of Thailand. The dish is a standard staple of street markets and readily available at all times. Being a typical Laotian dish, it is often paired with green papaya salad and sticky rice (Thai/Isan: ข้าวเหนียว, ;  or eaten with sticky rice in bamboo (khao lam in Lao). It is also eaten with raw vegetables, and often dipped in spicy sauces such as Laotian jaew bong.

In Thailand, there are also many famous Thai Muslim varieties of kai yang which are not of Lao origin at all, but more akin to the grilled chicken from Malaysia.

Names
The Laotian name for the dish is pīng kai and means "roast chicken". In Laotian restaurants in the West, it is known as "Laotian barbecued chicken" or "ping gai". The Thai and Isaan term is usually spelled ไก่ย่าง (kai yang;), although ปิ้งไก่ (ping kai), a Thai letter rendering of the Laotian name, would be understood in Isan and in most of Thailand as well although to Thai ears it would sound a bit quaint, due to the slight grammatical difference between Thai and Laotian. Thais would put kai before ping rather than the other way round. In the West, where this dish often features on the menu of Thai restaurants, it is either known by its Thai name kai yang or as "Thai barbecued chicken".

Ingredients and preparation
A whole chicken is often halved and pounded flat. It is marinated and then grilled over a low heat on a charcoal flame for a long time, but is not cooked to be burnt or dry. The marinade typically includes fish sauce, garlic, turmeric, coriander root (cilantro), and white pepper. Many variations exist, and it is also quite common to find black soy sauce, hoisin sauce, shallots, leaves and seeds of coriander, lemongrass, chilis, ginger, vinegar, palm sugar, and MSG.

See also
 List of barbecue dishes
 List of chicken dishes
 List of street foods
 Mu ping

References
 Tan, Terry. (2007). The Thai Table: A Celebration of Culinary Treasures. Marshall Cavendish. 
 Thompson, David. (2002). Thai Food: Arharn Thai. Ten Speed Press. 
 Brissenden, Rosemary. (2007). Southeast Asian food: Classic and Modern Dishes from Indonesia, Malaysia, Tuttle Publishing. 
 McDermoot, Nancie. (1992). Real Thai: The Best of Thailand's Regional Cooking. Chronicle Books. 

Isan cuisine
Chicken dishes
Barbecue
Street food
Lao cuisine